Myszaków  is a village in the administrative district of Gmina Zagórów, within Słupca County, Greater Poland Voivodeship, in west-central Poland.

The village has a population of 150.

One of the battles of the Polish January Uprising against the Russian Empire was fought near the village in 1863. There is a mass grave of the Polish insurgents in the village.

Notable people
Stanisław Kostanecki (1860–1910), one of the most renown Polish organic chemists
Kazimierz Kostanecki (1863–1940), Polish physician, anatomist, cytologist, murdered by the Germans in the Sachsenhausen concentration camp
 (1866–1941), Polish economist, rector of the University of Warsaw

References

Villages in Słupca County